Shishi or shi shi may refer to:

People
Empress Shi ( 23), or Shi Shi (史氏; "Woman Shi")
Shi Shi (emperor) (339–349), emperor of Later Zhao in 349
Shi Shi (Taiwanese singer) (Sun Sheng Xi, born 1990)
Li Shishi (1062–1127), a Chinese courtesan
Li Shishi (politician) (born 1953), a Chinese politician
Liu Shishi (born 1987), a Chinese actress and ballerina
Shishi Bunroku (1893–1969), Japanese writer and theater director

Places in China
Shishi, Fujian (石狮市)
 Shishi, Hengyang (石市镇), Hengyang County, Hunan

Other uses
Chinese guardian lions, also known as a shishi
Shishi (organization), Japanese political activists of the late Edo period
Shi Shi (giant panda) (c. 1970s – 2008)
Shishi (TV program) an Israeli news and current affairs program
Shishi High School, in Chengdu, Sichuan, China
Shishi Ranger, of the Dairangers from Gosei Sentai Dairanger

See also

Chi-Chi (disambiguation)
Shi (disambiguation)
Shishi-odoshi, Japanese devices made to scare away animals
Lion-Eating Poet in the Stone Den (pinyin: Shī Shì shí shī shǐ), homophonic poem by Yuen Ren Chao